The surrender of Caserta of 29 April 1945 was the written agreement that formalized the surrender of German and Italian Republican forces in Italy, ending the Italian Campaign of World War II. The document, signed at the Royal Palace of Caserta, was to become effective on 2 May 1945.

Although British Field Marshal Harold Alexander claimed the Surrender of Caserta shortened the war in Europe by six to eight weeks and saved Northern Italy from more destruction along with tens of thousands of lives, the German Commander-in-Chief of Army Group C Heinrich von Vietinghoff had noted on 28 April that fighting would cease within one or two days regardless of negotiations, the German troops having neither arms nor ammunition left. Further destruction was thus unlikely, Army Group C having decided already on 11 April not to carry out Hitler's scorched earth policy.

Owing in part to Allied air attacks, the German forces in Italy had received no supplies from Germany since the first week of April. Since Allied aircraft had destroyed all bridges across the Po river, the Germans abandoned their heavy weapons and motor vehicles south of it during the Allied spring offensive. What was left of the German infantry was mostly wiped out during the fighting. The remaining troops had retreated across the Po using improvised transports and were reorganized by blocking detachments to man the front line and fight on, but without arms their situation was hopeless.

References
Citations

Bibliography

Further reading
Text of the Instrument of Local Surrender of German and Other Forces Under the Command or Control of the German Commander-In-Chief Southwest from the Avalon Project

Italian campaign (World War II)
1945 in Italy
World War II treaties
April 1945 events
Treaties concluded in 1945
Treaties entered into force in 1945